Das Fräulein or Fräulein was directed by Swiss filmmaker Andrea Štaka in 2006, and won seven awards.

Plot

Ruza (Mirjana Karanović) a Serb, left Belgrade more than 25 years ago to seek a new life in Zurich. Now in her fifties, she has completely detached herself from the past. She owns a cafeteria and maintains an orderly, joyless existence. Mila (Ljubica Jović), a waitress there, is a good-humored Croatian woman who also emigrated decades ago, but, unlike Ruza, she dreams of returning to a house on the Croatian coast. Both of them receive a jolt when Ana (Marija Škaričić), a young Bosniak, itinerant woman who has fled Sarajevo, breezes into the cafeteria looking for work. Ruza hires her but is annoyed by Ana's impulsive and spirited efforts to inject life into the cafeteria. Gradually the acrimony will dissipate, as Ana, who hides a tragic secret under her passionate spirit, begins to thaw Ruža's chill, and their relationship will change both women in ways they never anticipated.

External links 
 
 
 

2006 films
Bosnian-language films
2000s Croatian-language films
2000s German-language films
Golden Leopard winners
2000s Serbian-language films
2006 multilingual films
Swiss multilingual films